Minden is a rural town and locality in the Somerset Region, Queensland, Australia.

Geography
Minden is located in the geographic region, but not local government area of Lockyer Valley at the northern foothills of the Little Liverpool Range.  The Warrego Highway passes through Minden from east to west.  It is the most southerly part of the Somerset Region local government area.

History

Originally the area was known as Back Plains or Rosewood Scrub but was changed to Minden in 1879 at the request of German settlers, after the town of Minden in Westphalia, Germany. In 1916 during World War I, the name was changed to Frenchton due to anti-German sentiment, but name Minden was restored in 1930.

Minden State School opened on 23 September 1878. In 1916 it was renamed Frenchton State School, but was later restored to Minden State School.

On Thursday 8 December 1891, Congregational (Lutheran) church opened in Minden. St John's Lutheran Church Coolana acelebrated its 125th anniversary with a special service on Sunday, 4 December 2016.

Frenchton Post Office opened on 1 July 1927 (a receiving office had been open from 1878, known as Rosewood Scrub until 1879 and Minden until 1916 during World War I), reverted to Minden in 1930 and closed in 1971.

At the 2011 census, Minden had a population of 1,093.

Education
Minden State School is a government primary (Prep-6) school for boys and girls at 1032 Lowood-Minden Road. In 2018, the school had an enrolment of 189 students with 12 teachers and 8 non-teaching staff (5 full-time equivalent).

Amenities 
St Johns Lutheran Church Coolana is 774 Lowood Minden Road. Despite the name, it is not within the current boundaries of neighbouring Coolana.

Minden Baptist Church is at 978 Lowood Minden Road.

Zion Lutheran Church is at 712 Tallegalla Road.

St John's Evangelican Lutheran Church is at 593 Tallegalla Road.

Facilities 
The Coolana Lutheran Cemetery Coolana is beside St Johns's Lutheran Church.

Minden Baptist Cemetery is beside the Minden Baptist Church.

Zion Lutheran Cemetery is beside the Zion Lutheran Church.

St John's Evangelican Lutheran Cemetery is beside St John's Evangelican Lutheran Church.

References

External links

 

Suburbs of Somerset Region
Towns in Queensland